"Ma chambre" (meaning "My Room") is a song recorded by Canadian singer Celine Dion. It was written by Jean-Pierre Ferland and Daniel Mercure, and produced by Jean-Alain Roussel. "Ma chambre" was included as B-side on singles released from Incognito in Canada in 1987. In 1988, it was featured on the Incognito album issued in France. Although not released as a single, radio stations started playing it on 31 August 1987 and on 12 September 1987 the song entered the chart in Quebec, spending five weeks on it and peaking at number thirty-eight. During the 1998 Gala de l'ADISQ, Dion performed the song live, sharing the stage with Ferland. In 2005, "Ma chambre" was included on Dion's compilation, On ne change pas.

Charts

References

1987 songs
Celine Dion songs
French-language songs